FC Bihor Oradea, commonly known as Bihor Oradea or simply as FC Bihor, is a Romanian professional football club based in the city of Oradea, Bihor County, currently playing in the Liga III.

The team was established on 28 July 2022, with the Municipality of Oradea, APTOR and Bihor County Council in the ownership, in order to continue the football tradition of the first FC Bihor Oradea, club which was founded on 1 April 1958, under the name of Crișul Oradea and was dissolved on 12 January 2016, due to financial debts and an insolvency that had been weighing heavily on the club's financial situation for years. The new entity was enrolled directly in the third division, on the place vacated by Club Atletic Oradea, football club where Oradea Municipality and APTOR where also in the ownership, but withdrew the support in order to establish a new FC Bihor. Club Atletic Oradea was instead enrolled in the Liga IV, under the private management that re-established the club in 2017.

History

Crișul played for three seasons in the first league: 1963–64 (7th place), 1964–65 (9th place) and 1965–66 (13th place), then it relegated to the Divizia B where it played for two seasons, 1966–67 (7th place) and 1967–68 (2nd place). In the summer of 1968, it qualified for the promotion play-off, held in Timișoara. There it managed to secure a place in the first league, coach A. Fernbach-Ferenczi, achieved this performance with the following players: Buiuc, Catona – Balogh, Sărac, A. Serfőző, E. Nagy, Popovici, Dărăban, Sudi, Szűcs, Tomeș, A. Nagy, A. Kun II, I. Kun I, I. Harsányi, E. Cociș, Ujlaki and Levai.

After another two seasons in Divizia A, 1968–69 (13th place) and 1969–70 (15th place) it relegated, but returned in the following season, 1970–71, this time under the leadership of coach Ladislau Vlad. The squad was composed of: Catona (Bologan) – Popovici (Sărac), Lukács, Bulc, Balogh, Dărăban, Neşu, Szűcs, A. Nagy, Arnoczky, Șchiopu. Substitutes: Baumgartner, Cocoș, Ceaușu, E. Cociș, Ungur and Moț. But again, after only one season 1971–72 (16th place) relegation to the Divizia B came. The club's highly oscillating behavior imposed a series of organizational measures, being rebuilt as a football club and renamed as Fotbal Club Bihor starting in 1972 the fight for the return in the top flight.

Between 1982 and 1991 was probably the most fruitful period in the history of the club. Bihorenii played 7 seasons in the top flight and only 2 in the second tier of the Romanian football system. With a lot of players that grew up in the red and blue kit such as: Marius Cheregi, Sorin Cigan, Sándor Kulcsár, Ovidiu Lazăr and Viorel Vancea and with some talented imported players such as Marcel Lăzăreanu and Zsolt Muzsnay (from Universitatea Cluj), Anton Weissenbacher (ex-Steaua București and Universitatea Craiova), Mircea Bolba (from Olimpia Satu Mare) or Alexandru Terheș (from FC Brașov) among others, with important coaches: Attila Kun and Paul Popovici (ex players from the 1960s and 1970s), Constantin Teașcă, Viorel Kraus, Viorel Mateianu, Ștefan Coidum or Robert Cosmoc, FC Bihor occupied the following positions: 1984–85 – 10th, 1985–86 – 18th, 1988–89 – 7th, 1989–90 – 10th and 1990–91 – 17th (Divizia A); 1986–87 – 4th and 1987–88 – 1st (Divizia B).

After the Romanian Revolution followed hard times and 1995–96 season was the most dramatic and closest to disaster season in the history of FC Bihor. With a precarious financial situation and a play more than modest, Bihorenii finished 17th out of 18, with only 31 points and relegated to Divizia C back after 35 years. With a fortune of two players, the rest being sold, FC Bihor had the power to take it from the beginning, with a new president and a new coach, Mircea Fodor and Nicolae Manea. In the squad appeared with much stronger performances players such as: Marius Popa and Cosmin Bărcăuan, players who were part of a very good generation, including other names like: Zeno Bundea or Viorel Domocoș, among others, but the team from Oradea finished only 7th in the fourth series, far away from promotion.

In the 2000–01 Divizia B season, the club was taken over by Marius Vizer, who started a project to bring in three years FC Bihor in the elite football. In his first season with Vizer as owner, FC Bihor finished 4th after a great second part of the championship succeeded by the players and their coach Ioan Andone. In 2001–02 Divizia B team reached the last podium position after UTA Arad and FC Baia Mare, then in the 2002–03 season FC Bihor has made a step forward, being in the second position after Unirea Alba Iulia. In those circumstances, Fotbal Club Oradea (as it was called then), coached by Ionuț Popa and chaired by Ioan Lucian, qualified for the Divizia A play-off, a match against Oțelul Galați. After the first round, FC Bihor lost 1–2, in Galați, but they took the revenge on the Municipal Stadium with 20,000 fans in the stands, beating Oțelul Galați with 3–1, the "golden goal" was scored by Bogdan Vrăjitoarea in overtime. Besides, all four goals in the double confrontation with Oțelul were scored by Bogdan Vrăjitoarea. The squad was composed of: Rotaru - Fl.Lazăr, Zaha, Cr.Munteanu - Gado, Naidin (Fele '63), Dumitra (captain), Fl.Călin ('67 Lungan) Sfârlea - Csehi, Vrăjitoarea. Substitutions: Mârne - Dianu, Măuță and Siminic. They could not play because of injuries, Coțan and Keșerü. The game against Oțelul accounted for FC Bihor supporters as the most important and beautiful game played by FC Bihor at home in its post-revolutionary history.

The adventure of FC Oradea in Divizia A was a short-lived one. After a hesitant first part of the season dotted with extraordinary results, like that 1-1 from the first round against Rapid București (the defending champions at that time), but also unexpected defeats as that against FC Brașov, in the last round of the first part. One of the artisans of the promotion, coach Ionuț Popa, was dismissed. It was the "beginning of the end". The club management, from which Marius Vizer withdrew, leaving the responsibility to the local government, decided to put in office the former coach of Steaua București, Dumitru Dumitriu, a move which proved to be unfortunate. In the first game of the second part, FC Oradea not gathered too many points and Dumitriu was sacked. By the end of the season, "the Red and Blues" failed to obtain the points necessary to maintain in Divizia A and were relegated after only one year in the big football.

After the relegation, followed years of struggle in the second division and at the beginning of 2010's, the club entered in insolvency. FC Bihor promoted back in 2011, but a Liga I licence was denied by the Romanian Football Federation and from this moment the decay started, finally on 12 January 2016 the club was declared bankrupt.

In the summer of 2021, Club Atletic Oradea announced that will be a break up between the owners of the club (Oradea Municipality, APTOR and Oradea Renaștem Împreună) due to a difference of opinion between the public and the private parts. Municipality of Oradea wanted a merger between the two brands, Club Atletic Oradea (owned by Oradea Renaștem Împreună) and FC Bihor Oradea (owned by the Municipality), while the private side did not agree with this and wanted to continue the Club Atletic Oradea project. The owners agreed that the private management of the club will retire from the executive management and the association will work as Club Atletic Oradea only for another season, being expected an exchange of places through which FC Bihor (supported by the public owners), will reach the third tier, while the private owners (Oradea Renaștem Împreună, the official owner of the Club Atletic Oradea brands) will continue to support the white and green club, but a division below, back in the fourth league.

On 24 June 2022, Club Atletic Oradea announced officially the break up, and that the club will continue in the county leagues, under the ownership of the private management, which also own the Club Atletic Oradea brands, registered at the Romanian State Office for Inventions and Trademarks. On the place of CAO, in the Liga III will play the club owned by the Municipality of Oradea and APTOR.

On 28 July 2022, the local authorities approved the organizational chart of the newly established ACS Fotbalistic Oradea, entity that will use FC Bihor Oradea brand. The ownership of the club will be formed of Oradea Municipality, APTOR and Bihor County Council. The club was enrolled directly in the Liga III, on the place vacated by Club Atletic Oradea and the former player of FC Bihor Oradea (1958), Sándor Kulcsár, was named as the new chairman.

Youth program

Youth academy of FC Bihor Oradea (1958) gave important names for the Romanian and international football such as: Sebastian Achim, Cosmin Bărcăuan, Zeno Bundea, Cristian Cigan, Viorel Domocoș, Ioan Filip, Ramses Gado, Ovidiu Hoban, Claudiu Keșerü, Attila Kun, Ovidiu Lazăr, Raymond Lukacs, Marius Popa, Daniel Usvat or Ion Zare.

After the declaration of bankruptcy in 2016, CSM Oradea announced the establishment of the football department and took the youth academy of FC Bihor. Between 2017 and 2022, Club Atletic Oradea formed its academy following the partnership signed with CSM Oradea, the club which took over the youth academy of FC Bihor Oradea (1958).

In the summer of 2022, Club Atletic Oradea and CSM Oradea broke the partnership they had, then CSM Oradea, sports club supported by the Municipality of Oradea, started a partnership with the newly established FC Bihor Oradea. FC Bihor Academy is now coordinated by Stelian Farcău and the coaches of the youth groups are Claudiu Mutu, Sorin Todea, Horea Rădulescu, Sorin Pop, Lucian Ciocan and Adrian Gongolea.

Grounds

FC Bihor Oradea plays its home matches on the Iuliu Bodola Stadium in Oradea, stadium that was also used by FC Bihor Oradea (1958) between 1958 and 2016. The stadium holds 11,155 people, restricted from 18,000 due to advanced stage of degradation of the second stand. It used to be called Municipal Stadium, but in November 2008 the name was changed to Iuliu Bodola, after the famous player. The stadium is also equipped with a second ground with natural grass and an artificial turf pitch, but the latter being a small size one.

Players

First-team squad

Out on loan

Club officials

Board of directors

 Last updated: 1 August 2022
 Source: Board of directors

Technical staff

 Last updated: 1 August 2022
 Source: Technical staff

League history

References

External links

Association football clubs established in 2022
Sport in Oradea
Football clubs in Romania
Football clubs in Bihor County
Liga III clubs
2022 establishments in Romania